Dominic Tang Yee-ming, S.J. (Simplified Chinese: 邓以明; Traditional Chinese: 鄧以明; Pinyin: Dèng Yǐmíng; Wade-Giles: Teng I-ming; May 13, 1908 – June 27, 1995) was a Chinese Jesuit priest. Appointed Bishop in 1951 and later archbishop of Canton, he spent twenty-two years in jail for his loyalty to the Catholic Church and died in exile in the United States.

Jesuit and Bishop 
He was born in Hong Kong and decided to enter the Jesuit novitiate in Spain in August 1930. Back in China, he studied Catholicism in Shanghai.  He was ordained as a priest at the age of 33 on 31 May 1941 during World War II. After his ordination he worked as a parish priest, principal of a primary school and did social welfare work in the Ecclesiastical Province of Guangzhou. Pope Pius XII
appointed him on 1 October 1950 as Apostolic Administrator of Canton (Guangzhou), and on 13 February 1951 was ordained titular bishop of Elateia by Bishop Gustave Deswaziere, who said of him: "By accepting the appointment from the Holy See in these difficult times, the new bishop was showing absolute obedience and a spirit of sacrifice."

Twenty-two years in Jail 
Archbishop Tang was arrested on February 5, 1958. The People's Republic of China charged him as "the most faithful running-dog of the reactionary Vatican." He remained in jail for 22 years in Laogai prison because he refused to sever contact with the Pope, as the government ordered him to. His sudden release (on June 2, 1980)  was due to a developing cancer, he then was given permission to leave the People's Republic of China for a cancer operation in Hong Kong.

Archbishop Tang was never brought to trial, and therefore, was never convicted of any crime. After his release, he never showed any bitterness for his 22 years of imprisonment, even though no apology was ever given by the Chinese government.

Later years 
On 26 May 1981, at the age of 73, he was appointed Archbishop of Canton (Guangzhou), which was rejected by China at once. In 1987, he released his book How Inscrutable His Ways! In it he summarized his attitudes while incarcerated for 22 years:

 "In prison, I always asked God to grant me the grace to progress in virtue., e.g. humility and obedience....I obeyed only the regulations which did not conflict with the principles of my faith. I want to be gentle and kind to others, without resisting ill-treatment from others; when controlled and walked on, I did not complain. There are many opportunities for practicing virtue in prison." 
 "When I was a seminarian, I learned to do God's will. God's will required me to practice virtue in prison. This was God's love for me."<ref>Dominic Tang Yee-ming, How Inscrutable His Ways!</ref>He died in Stamford, Connecticut at the age of 87 and was buried at Mission Santa Clara de Asís in Santa Clara, California. 

References

Further reading
 Dominic Tang Yee-ming, How Inscrutable His Ways!'' St. Aidan Press, 1987
 Remembering  Archbishop Tang Yee-Ming, SJ The Cardinal Kung Foundation, Summer 1995 - https://web.archive.org/web/20050826131204/http://www.cardinalkungfoundation.org/articles/tang.htm
 Dominic Tang Yee-ming. (2008). Encyclopædia Britannica Online: http://www.britannica.com/EBchecked/topic/582413/Dominic-Tang-Yee-ming

1908 births
1995 deaths
Religious persecution by communists
20th-century Roman Catholic archbishops in China
Jesuit archbishops
Hong Kong Jesuits
Burials at Mission Santa Clara de Asís
People from British Hong Kong
Chinese Roman Catholic archbishops